Nahr-e Homeyseh (also Romanized as Nahr-e Ḩomeyseh; also known as Ḩomeyseh and Rūstā-ye Ḩomeyseh) is a village in Nasar Rural District, Arvandkenar District, Abadan County, Khuzestan Province, Iran. At the 2006 census, its population was 176, in 39 families.

References 

Populated places in Abadan County